Rampart is an unincorporated community in Placer County, California. It is approximately 2 miles from the Squaw Valley and Alpine Meadows ski areas, along the Truckee River. It lies at an elevation of 6201 feet (1890 m).

It was first noted in a USGS survey map in 1936.  Rampart was an occasional stop along the "Overland Limited" route to other parts of the country while the train ran along the Truckee river, between Tahoe City and Truckee on its way over the mountains.

History 
In 1910 the wealthy John Walter's family of San Francisco acquired the beginning lot with additional pieces added to complete the 10.94 acres. In 1913, they began building the main lodge, the first of 12 buildings. The property was used every summer as their mountain retreat for women, guests and children.  The heirs of the Walters family sold the property in 1959. Later it became a vacation lodge with horses, fly fishing, hiking trails and skiing. Signs of the rope tow up a small ski hill and the tennis court still exist from those activities. In 1971, Rampart became a bustling rental property until fire razed the main lodge. The current family ownership began in 1973.

Current Conditions 
The property has not been maintained over the years.  Each building has significant structural issues such as collapsed roofs or fire damage.  They are boarded up and not very easily entered.   There are still many remnants of previous life in the area - the local dump for glass and other rubbish is still visible amongst the trees.  Signs of a tow rope ski lift still exist from the 1950s.

References

Unincorporated communities in California
Unincorporated communities in Placer County, California